Grande Fratello VIP 2 (as known by the acronym GFVIP2)  is the second celebrity season of the Italian reality television franchise Grande Fratello.

It was launched on Monday 11 September 2017 on Canale 5, with Ilary Blasi as presentator of the grand gala show on air every week, and Alfonso Signorini as opinionist, and Gialappa's Band. It was ended on Monday 4 December 2017 and the winner was Daniele Bossari. The 24h live is broadcast on Mediaset Extra, daily pillows are broadcast on Canale 5, Italia 1 and La 5. The show was scheduled to air for 12 weeks.

Housemates 
The age of the housemates refers to the time of entry into the house.

Future Appearances
 In 2020, Cristiano Malgioglio returned for the fifth season of Grande Fratello VIP, where he placed 17th.
 In 2021, Carmen Russo returned for the sixth season of Grande Fratello VIP, where she placed 22th.
 In 2021, Luca Onestini appeared as a contestant on the first season of the Spanish version of Secret Story, whete he placed 1st. In 2022, he returned for the seventh season of Grande Fratello VIP, he's currently competing.

Nominations table
 Blue team (Week 1 - 3)
 Red team (Week 1 - 3)
 Immune

Note

: Housemates are divided into two teams. They are only able to nominate one housemate from their team.
: Aida won the week's challenge. Her vote worths double.
: In Week 2 the red team could only nominate males and Cecilia & Jeremias; the blue team could only nominate females. Housemate with most nominations from each team facing public vote.
: In Week 3 the red team could only nominate females; the blue team could only nominate males. Housemate with most nominations from each team facing public vote.
: Marco won the week's challenge. He can't vote but he can use immunity for the following week (to save himself or another player).
: Marco was ejected due to his blaspheme behaviour.
: Cecilia & Jeremias (who entered in the house as a single contestant because they are the respectively the sister and the brother of Belen Rodriguez) were divided since Week 4.
: Ignazio won the week's challenge. He can't vote but he can use immunity (to save himself or another player).
: Gianluca was ejected due to his blaspheme behaviour.
: Lorenzo re-entered in the house because he had the jolly card.

TV Ratings

References

External links 
 Official site 

2017 Italian television seasons
02